The 2017 Princess Auto Elite 10 was held from March 16 to 20 at Port Hawkesbury Civic Centre in Port Hawkesbury, Nova Scotia. It was the fifth Grand Slam of Curling event held in the 2016–17 curling season. The tournament was held between ten men's teams.

Teams

Round robin standings

Round robin results
All draw times are listed in Atlantic Standard Time (UTC−8).

Draw 1
Thursday, March 16, 12:00 pm

Draw 2
Thursday, March 16, 4:00 pm

Draw 3
Thursday, March 16, 7:30 pm

Draw 4
Friday, March 17, 10:00 am

Draw 5
Friday, March 17, 1:00 pm

Draw 6
Friday, March 17, 4:30 pm

Draw 7
Friday, March 17, 8:00 pm

Playoffs

Quarterfinals
Saturday, March 18, 1:00 pm

Semifinals
Saturday, March 18, 5:00 pm

Final
Sunday, March 19, 11:00 am

References

External links

2017 in Canadian curling
Curling in Nova Scotia
Inverness County, Nova Scotia
2017 in Nova Scotia
March 2017 sports events in Canada